This is a list of franchise records for the Ottawa Senators (established 1992) of the National Hockey League, not including shortened seasons.

Club records

Points
Most points: 113 (2002–03, 2005–06)
Most points, home: 61 (2005–06)
Most points, away: 53 (2002–03)
Fewest points: 24 (1992–93)
Fewest points, home: 20 (1993–94)
Fewest points, away: 2 (1992–93)

Wins
Most wins, overall: 52 (2002–03, 2005–06)
Most wins, home: 29 (2005–06)
Most wins, away: 24 (2003–03)
Fewest wins, overall: 10 (1992–93)
Fewest wins, home: 8 (1993–94)
Fewest wins, away: 1† (1992–93)

Regulation losses
Most losses, overall: 70 (1992–93)
Most losses, home: 30 (1993–94)
Most losses, away: 40† (1992–93)
Fewest losses, overall: 21 (1998–99, 2000–01, 2002–03, 2005–06)
Fewest losses, home: 7 (1997–98)
Fewest losses, away: 10 (1998–99)

Overtime losses
Most losses, overall: 14 (2013-14)
Most losses, home: 8 (2016-17)
Most losses, away: 8 (2013–14, 2014–15)
Fewest losses, overall: 1 (2002–03)
Fewest losses, home: 1 (2002-03)
Fewest losses, away: 0 (1990-00, 2002-03)

Ties
Most ties, overall: 15 (1996–97, 1997–98, 1998–99)
Most ties, home: 8 (1996–97, 1998–99, 2002–03)
Most ties, away: 8 (1997–98)
Fewest ties, overall: 4 (1992–93)
Fewest ties, home: 3 (2001–02)
Fewest ties, away: 0† (1992–93)

Longest streaks
Winning streak, overall: 11 (January 14, 2010 – February 4, 2010) 
Winning streak, home: 9 (March 5, 2009 – April 7, 2009)
Winning streak, away: 6 (March 18, 2003 – April 5, 2003, January 14, 2010 – February 3, 2010)
Losing streak: 14  (March 3, 1993 – April 7, 1993)
Losing streak, home: 11† (October 27, 1993 – December 8, 1993)
Losing streak, away: 38† (October 10, 1992 – April 3, 1993)
Unbeaten streak: 11 (4x) (last: January 14, 2010 – February 4, 2010)
Unbeaten streak, home: 12 (December 18, 2003 – January 24, 2004 (10–0–2–0))
Unbeaten streak, away: 7 (3×) (last: November 25, 2003 – January 8, 2004 (5–0–2–0))
Winless streak: 21 (October 10, 1992 – November 23, 1992 (0–20–1))
Winless streak, home: 17 (October 28, 1995 – January 27, 1996 (0–15–2))
Winless streak, away: 38† (October 10, 1992 – April 3, 1993 (0–38–0))

Goals
 Most goals, period: 6 (March 21, 2000, 1st period vs Atlanta (7–1))
 Most goals, game: 11 (November 13, 2001, at Washington (11–5))
 Most goals, season: 312 (2005–06)
 Most Allowed, period: 7 (December 17, 1993, 2nd period at Washington (2–11))
 Most Allowed, game: 12 (October 30, 1992, at Buffalo (3–12))
 Most Allowed, season: 397 (1993–94)

Power play:
 Most, period: 3 (8x) (last: October 10, 2015, 2nd period at Toronto (5–4))
 Most, game: 6 (December 17, 2005, vs Toronto (8–2))
 Most, season: 102 (2005–06)
 Most allowed, period: 4 (December 9, 1998, 1st period at Florida (5–6))
 Most allowed, game: 5 (5×) (last: December 10, 2006, at Columbus (2–6))
 Most allowed, season: 115 (1992–93)

Short-handed:
 Most, period: 2 (7×), (last: January 27, 2020, 3rd period vs New Jersey (3–4))
 Most, game: 3 (4×), (last: March 19, 2016, vs Montreal (5–0))
 Most, season: 25 (2005–06)
 Most allowed, period: 2 (3x), (last: February 16, 2019, 1st period at Winnipeg (4–3))
 Most allowed, game: 3 (March 2, 2000, at New York Islanders (5–5))
 Most allowed, season: 14 (1993–94, 1995–96)

Shutouts
Most shutouts, overall: 10 (2001–02, 2016-17)
Most shutouts, home: 6 (2001–02)
Most shutouts, away: 6 (1997–98)
Most allowed, overall: 10 (1997–98, 2017-18)
Most allowed, home: 6 (2010-11)
Most allowed, away: 8 (2017-18)

Penalties
Most PIM, period: 200 (March 5, 2004, 3rd period, at Philadelphia)
Most PIM, game: 206 (March 5, 2004, at Philadelphia)
Most PIM, season: 1716 (1992–93)
Notes:
 † NHL record
 ‡ Surpassed in (current) season

Source: Ottawa Senators

Individual records

Source: Ottawa Senators

See also
List of Ottawa Senators players
List of NHL players

References

Records
National Hockey League statistical records
rec